Cato Perkins was an African-American slave from Charleston, South Carolina who became a missionary to Sierra Leone.

He was enslaved by John Perkins.
Cato Perkins self-emancipated by joining the British during the Siege of Charleston and he joined General Clinton in New York and worked as a carpenter there. Perkins was evacuated to Birchtown, Nova Scotia in 1783 and he is listed in the Book of Negroes. Upon arriving in Nova Scotia he was converted by John Marrant of the Countess of Huntingdon's Connexion, which was a Methodist splinter group. Perkins migrated to Sierra Leone, where he led a strike of carpenters against the Sierra Leone Company. Cato Perkins established the first Huntingdon's Connexion church, and later on other Nova Scotian settler preachers established churches in the Liberated African villages. Cato Perkins died in 1805 and his churches are the remnant of the Huntingdon's Connexion churches around the world.

Sources

American rebel slaves
American Methodist missionaries
African-American Methodist clergy
American Methodist clergy
Black Loyalists
Methodist missionaries in Sierra Leone
Nova Scotian Settlers
Sierra Leone Creole people
1805 deaths
Year of birth unknown
18th-century American slaves
African-American missionaries